Greenwood is a town in Jackson County, Florida, United States. The population was 686 at the 2010 census.

Geography

Greenwood is located at  (30.873517, –85.162431).

Greenwood is ten miles from the county seat, Marianna, and the town of Malone. Both are much larger than Greenwood, and most residents of the area go to school or work in either of those two towns.

Transportation
  State Road 71

Demographics

2020 census

As of the 2020 United States census, there were 539 people, 221 households, and 152 families residing in the town.

2000 census
As of the census of 2000, there were 735 people, 296 households, and 200 families residing in the town. The racial makeup of the town was 66.67% White, 26.94% African American, 1.22% Native American, 0.95% Asian, 1.90% from other races, and 2.31% from two or more races. Hispanic or Latino of any race were 2.72% of the population.

There were 300 households, out of which 29.1% had children under the age of 18 living with them, 52.4% were married couples living together, 11.8% had a female householder with no husband present, and 32.1% were non-families. 29.4% of all households were made up of individuals, and 13.5% had someone living alone who was 65 years of age or older.  The average household size was 2.44 and the average family size was 2.99.

In the town, the population was spread out, with 26.4% under the age of 18, 7.2% from 18 to 24, 24.6% from 25 to 44, 25.0% from 45 to 64, and 16.7% who were 65 years of age or older.  The median age was 38 years. For every 100 females, there were 87.0 males.  For every 100 females age 18 and over, there were 89.8 males.

The median income for a household in the town was $28,750, and the median income for a family was $35,750. Males had a median income of $24,583 versus $22,083 for females. The per capita income for the town was $14,243.  About 9.1% of families and 17.8% of the population were below the poverty line, including 21.6% of those under age 18 and 11.6% of those age 65 or over.

Gallery

References

Towns in Jackson County, Florida
Towns in Florida